The Royal Court is a music production team formed by producer Timbaland and Solomon "King" Logan. Their first work was the single "Ice Box" by Omarion from the album 21, co-produced with Timbaland.

Discography

2006

Omarion - 21
"Ice Box" (prod. by King Logan, Johnkenun Spivery, Timbaland )
"Beg For It" (prod. by King Logan, Johnkenun Spivery, Timbaland )

2007

Bobby Valentino - Special Occasion
"Anonymous" (prod. by King Logan and Timbaland)
"Rearview (Ridin)" (prod. by King Logan, Jerome Harmon, and Timbaland)

Omarion & Kat DeLuna - Feel The Noise OST
"Cut Off Time" (prod. by King Logan, Johnkenun Spivery and Timbaland)

Mario - Go!
"No Definition" (prod. by King Logan and Timbaland)

NLT - Not Like Them
"She Said, I Said"  (prod. by King Logan, Johnkenun Spivery, and Timbaland)

The DEY - The DEY Has Come EP
"Get The Feeling" (prod. by Timbaland, King Logan, Johnkenun Spivery)

2008

Ashlee Simpson - Bittersweet World
"Outta My Head (Ay Ya Ya)" (prod. by King Logan, Jerome Harmon, and Timbaland)
"Murder (I Get Away..)" (prod. by King Logan, Jerome Harmon, and Timbaland)
"Bittersweet World" (prod. by King Logan, Jerome Harmon, and Timbaland)
"Rag Doll" (prod. by King Logan, Jerome Harmon, and Timbalandn)
"Rule Breaker" (prod. by King Logan, Jerome Harmon, and Timbaland)
"What I've Become" (prod. King Logan, Jerome Harmon, and Timbaland)

2009

Chris Cornell - Scream
"Enemy" (prod. by King Logan, Jerome Harmon, Timbaland, and Ryan Tedder)

Keri Hilson - In a Perfect World…
"Slow Dance" (prod. by King Logan and Johnkenun Spivery)

Omarion feat Lil Wayne - 
"Comfort" (prod. by King Logan)

Rihanna - 
"Like It" (prod. by King Logan)

Jennifer Lopez - Love?
"Countdown"
"Whippin My Hair"

References

External links
 Online Article on "The Royal Court"
 The Thomas Crown Chronicles' "Royal Court" News Archives

Year of birth missing (living people)
Living people
African-American record producers
Record production teams
American hip hop record producers
21st-century African-American people